The 2019 Bojangles' Southern 500 presented by John Deere, the 70th running of the event was a Monster Energy NASCAR Cup Series race held on September 1-2, 2019, at Darlington Raceway in Darlington, South Carolina. Contested over 367 laps on the  egg-shaped oval, it was the 25th race of the 2019 Monster Energy NASCAR Cup Series season.

Report

Background

Darlington Raceway is a race track built for NASCAR racing located near Darlington, South Carolina. It is nicknamed "The Lady in Black" and "The Track Too Tough to Tame" by many NASCAR fans and drivers and advertised as "A NASCAR Tradition." It is of a unique, somewhat egg-shaped design, an oval with the ends of very different configurations, a condition which supposedly arose from the proximity of one end of the track to a minnow pond the owner refused to relocate. This situation makes it very challenging for the crews to set up their cars' handling in a way that is effective at both ends.

Entry list
 (i) denotes driver who are ineligible for series driver points.
 (R) denotes rookie driver.

Practice

First practice

Final practice

Qualifying

Qualifying results

Race

Stage results

Stage One
Laps: 100

Stage Two
Laps: 100

Final stage results

Stage Three
Laps: 167

Race statistics
 Lead changes: 13 among 8 different drivers
 Cautions/Laps: 7 for 35
 Red flags: 0
 Time of race: 3 hours, 44 minutes and 46 seconds
 Average speed:

Media

Television
NBC Sports covered the race on the television side. Rick Allen, two–time Darlington winner Jeff Burton, Steve Letarte and Dale Earnhardt Jr. were in the booth to call the race. Dave Burns, Marty Snider and Kelli Stavast reported from pit lane during the race. Earnhardt Jr., Dale Jarrett and Kyle Petty also called a portion of the race as part of the Throwback Weekend.

Radio
The Motor Racing Network (MRN) called the race for radio, which was simulcast on Sirius XM NASCAR Radio. Alex Hayden, Jeff Striegle, and Rusty Wallace called the action for MRN when the field raced down the front stretch. Dave Moody called the race from a Billboard outside of turn 1 when the field raced through turns 1 and 2, and Mike Bagley called the race atop of the Darlington Raceway Club outside of turn 3 when the field raced through turns 3 and 4. Winston Kelley, Steve Post, and Kim Coon called the action on pit road for MRN.

Standings after the race

Drivers' Championship standings

Manufacturers' Championship standings

 Note: Only the first 16 positions are included for the driver standings.
 . – Driver has clinched a position in the Monster Energy NASCAR Cup Series playoffs.

References

2019 Monster Energy NASCAR Cup Series
Historically themed events
NASCAR races at Darlington Raceway
September 2019 sports events in the United States
2019 in sports in South Carolina